Williams Chapel A.M.E. Church is a historic African Methodist Episcopal church located at 1198 Glover Street in Orangeburg, Orangeburg County, South Carolina. It was built between 1915 and 1925, and is a one-story, brick Gothic Revival-style church building on a raised basement.  It features two towers on the facade with pyramidal roofs and Gothic arched stained glass windows.

It was added to the National Register of Historic Places in 1985.

References

African Methodist Episcopal churches in South Carolina
Churches on the National Register of Historic Places in South Carolina
Gothic Revival church buildings in South Carolina
Churches completed in 1925
20th-century Methodist church buildings in the United States
Churches in Orangeburg County, South Carolina
African-American history of South Carolina
National Register of Historic Places in Orangeburg County, South Carolina